Kiss in the Dark (K.I.D.) was a Swiss pop duo from Zürich, Switzerland, formed in 1986 by Kilian Albert Merz (DJKAM) and Thomas Krucker.  They signed in 1988 worldwide with Phonogram Records GmbH (Mercury Records) in Germany. In the late 1980s and early 1990s, K.I.D. had several chart successes with tracks such as "The Phonecall", and "Backfield in Motion" in Western Europe, in particular Germany and Switzerland. Most of K.I.D.'s music was recorded and produced at Sigma Sound Studios in New York City, working with the audio engineer and record producer Tony Maserati.

Discography

LPs, EPs and singles
1988: Phonecall (EP), Mercury, Germany
1988: "The Phonecall" (Single), Mercury, Germany
1988: The Phonecall (EP), Mercury, Germany
1989: Backfield in Motion (EP), Mercury, Phonogram, Germany
1989: Backfield in Motion (EP), Phonogram, Germany
1989: "Backfield in Motion" (Single), Mercury, Phonogram, Germany
1989: Something Special (EP), Mercury, Europe
1989: Something Special (EP), Mercury, Germany
1989: The First Kiss (LP), Mercury, Europe
1989: The First Kiss (LP), Phonogram, Switzerland

References

Swiss pop music groups